Jacinto Morano González (born 1984) is a Spanish labour lawyer and politician. He has served as member of the 10th Assembly of Madrid in the Podemos Parliamentary Group, as well as Senator.

Biography 
Born on 5 February 1984 in Madrid, he graduated in Law and Economy at the Charles III University of Madrid (UC3M), As lawyer, he participated in the processes regarding the collective dismissal procedure in Canal Nou, representing the General Confederation of Labor (CGT), and the collective dismissal procedure in Telemadrid.

He ran 7th in the Podemos list for the 2015 Madrilenian regional election, and became a member of the 10th term of the regional legislature. During the legislative period he has been ascribed to the "anticapitalista" faction of the Podemos parliamentary group, although, similarly to Isabel Serra or Beatriz Gimeno, he estranged himself off from the faction at some point of the term. Following his appointment as Senator on 7 February 2019 by the Assembly of Madrid, he joined the Upper House on 19 February. On 11 March 2019 his inclusion in the Isabel Serra-led list to the regional primary election in Podemos (prior to the 2019 Madrilenian regional election) was announced.

References 

1984 births
Living people
Members of the 10th Assembly of Madrid
Members of the 12th Senate of Spain
Members of the 13th Senate of Spain
Members of the 11th Assembly of Madrid